Buffalo Bull Knob is a summit in Webster County, West Virginia, near Webster Springs.

The summit's name recalls an incident when one of the last wild buffaloes in the area was killed by a hunter near its base.

References

Mountains of Webster County, West Virginia
Mountains of West Virginia